St Helena Secondary College is a co-educational state secondary school in Eltham North, Victoria, Australia. The school is situated within the City of Banyule local council area, and has an enrolment ceiling (maximum number of students).  Because demand for places at the school is higher than this ceiling in some years, the school has a geographic zone around it within which students are prioritised for enrolment.  As well as its academic focus, St Helena has a number of extra-curricular activities including an extensive music program, musicals and sporting programs.

Structure 

The school is divided into three separate 'mini schools', each catering for the needs of the students at the different stages of their development. Each mini school also has its own principal. These 'Mini School Principals' work mainly with their own mini school, while also being involved in school-wide positions and tasks. The current principals are: Junior School - Shaun Isbister; Middle School - Vittoria Saliba; Senior School - Simon Braknys.  The College Principal is Karen Terry.

Performance 

Rock Eisteddfod

The college was involved in the Rock Eisteddfod annual competition until it ceased in 2012. The performances, although limited to eight minutes, enabled over 100 students each year to work together to create and perform a dance routine focused on positive lifestyles.

Drama

In 2004 the first College Production was staged. The play "I’m on TV" allowed students, with the aid of director Emma Oliver, to build on and act out a story. The project was considered a success and has been added to the college's list of annual events. This provides another option to students interested in drama and performance.

In 2020, the school introduced the Northern Youth Performing Arts academy program, which provides students with after-school alumni-led workshops and performance opportunities to encourage further improvement in theatre and dance skills. 

Musical production

The musical production is a yearly event, directed previously by Glenda Evans and currently directed by Christopher Hewitt. In its long-running history the St Helena Performing Arts community has completed many shows. 

One particular aspect of the college musical productions is a yearly Juanita Coco Award, named for Juanita Coco, an ex-student of the college who was an exemplary student and person, as well as a member of Young Talent Time. Unfortunately, she was killed in a car accident in 1993 before that year's show could be performed, and this award was enacted in her honour to be presented to the cast member who exemplifies the qualities Juanita stood for.

Instrumental music

All of St Helena's students are encouraged to learn a musical instrument. There are currently four concert bands, with brass, woodwind and percussion instruments, four jazz bands, as well as many smaller ensembles.

Each year, the Senior Concert Band and the Senior Jazz Band travel interstate to compete in band competitions.

Notable past students
Alicia Banit - Actress
Alyssa Bannan- AFLW
Christie Whelan Browne-actress
Jaryd Clifford - Paralympic athlete
Juanita Coco - Young Talent Time star
Brayden Fiorini - AFL footballer
Luke Godden - AFL Footballer
Chris Kamolins - AFL Umpire
Luke Kidgell - Comedian
Lachlan Jones - Paralympian
Darcy Macpherson - AFL footballer
Alex Patterson - Matador
Simon Prestigiacomo - AFL Footballer
Adam Simpson- AFL footballer
Nick Vlastuin - AFL footballer

References

External links
School Website
School Newsletter Page

Educational institutions established in 1984
Rock Eisteddfod Challenge participants
Public high schools in Melbourne
1984 establishments in Australia
Buildings and structures in the City of Banyule